Jacklyn, formerly known as LPV, Stena Freighter, Stena Seafreighter, RFA Sea Chieftain, and Stena Hispanica, was a roll-on/roll-off cargo ship which was purchased by Blue Origin in 2018 for use as a landing platform ship. Ultimately, Blue Origin abandoned their plans to use the ship as a landing platform, and in August 2022, the ship was towed to the Port of Brownsville for scrapping.

History 

Stena Freighter was built by Società Esercizio Cantieri of Viareggio, Italy, and completed in 2004 by Elektromehanika d.o.o. at Kraljevica Shipyard, Croatia, for Swedish operator Stena Line.

The ship was initially laid down in February 1997 as Stena Hispanica for Stena Line, but on 5 May 1998 was renamed  after the British Ministry of Defence (MoD) contracted with Stena for a long-term charter of the vessel for freight-carrying capacity to support the Joint Rapid Reaction Force. The ship was launched just four days later on 9 May 1998.

Società Esercizio Cantieri had fallen into financial difficulties, and the contract for the ship was cancelled in 1998 due to delays in construction. At the time, work on the hull was complete and the ship 50% finished. The shipyard went bankrupt in 1999, and all work on the ship ceased.

In 2002, "the incomplete vessel was purchased from a bankruptcy estate at auction by Stena Line" and renamed Stena Seafreighter. After months of additional financial and performance difficulties by several shipyards in Slovenia and Croatia in 2003, she was towed to Arsenale Shipyard in Venice, and then steamed under her own power to Kraljevica in Croatia for final completion. As a result of the delays, the ship never sailed as a Royal Fleet Auxiliary for the British Ministry of Defence. The ship was renamed Stena Freighter and delivered to Stena Line in March 2004.

Stena Freighter operated on a number of ferry routes including Gothenburg–Travemünde, Gothenburg–Kiel, and the Harwich–Rotterdam (Europoort) service.

Stena confirmed the sale of the vessel on 30 August 2018, and in October 2018, Blue Origin, a U.S. launch service provider and space technology company owned by Amazon founder Jeff Bezos, confirmed it was the purchaser. The vessel sailed to Florida and arrived at Pensacola in October 2018 to commence a refit. In March 2017, Blue Origin had unveiled the concept of landing a rocket on a hydrodynamically-stabilized ship that was underway, but did not reveal which marine vessel would be used as the landing platform until October 2018.

Blue Origin called the ship LPV, short for Landing Platform Vessel. In December 2020, it was renamed Jacklyn, after Jeff Bezos' mother Jacklyn Bezos.

In April 2022, news surfaced that Blue Origin is no longer certain of plans to use Jacklyn for landing the first stage boosters of New Glenn.

In August 2022, Blue Origin abandoned the project to build a landing platform ship. Jacklyn was towed out of the Port of Pennsacola on 15 August to transit to the Port of Brownsville, Texas, where the ship was scrapped.

Landing platform plans 

If the ship had been used for rocket landings, the rocket boosters were planned to be recovered downrange of the Cape Canaveral Launch Complex 36 (LC-36) in the Atlantic Ocean while the hydrodynamically-stabilized ship was underway. The ship stabilization technology was intended to increase the likelihood of successful rocket recovery in rough seas, as well as helping to carry out launches on schedule.

The first stage boosters of New Glenn are intended to be reusable, and Jacklyn was to recover the boosters downrange in the Atlantic Ocean east of the launch site. The ship would not have been crewed at the time the New Glenn booster was going to be landing; but rather would be autonomously or telerobotically controlled.

In October 2018, Blue Origin said that their plans were to make the first orbital launch of New Glenn in 2021, but in February 2021, stated that the maiden flight was now targeted for late 2022, but the ship is no longer planned to be used after Blue Origin abandoned the project to refit it as a landing platform ship.

See also 

 
 
 Virgin Galactic VMS Eve; the Virgin vehicle named after the founder's mother

References

External links 
 New Glenn: The Road to Space at YouTube by Blue Origin, 16 January 2019. Landing sequence on LPV starts at 01:18.

Blue Origin
Ro-ro ships
Maritime vessels related to spaceflight
Floating launch vehicle operations platform
Ships built in Italy
Ships built in Croatia
1998 ships